"Big John (Ain't You Gonna Marry Me)" is a song written by John Patton and Amiel Sommers and performed by The Shirelles.  It was featured on their 1962 album, Baby It's You.

The song was produced by Luther Dixon and recorded at Bell Sound Studios in New York City.

Chart history
The song reached #2 on the R&B chart and #21 on the Billboard Hot 100 in 1961.

In media
The song was featured in the jukebox musical Baby It's You!

References

1961 songs
1961 singles
The Shirelles songs
Scepter Records singles